"Bubble Pop!" is a song recorded by South Korean singer Hyuna for her debut extended play Bubble Pop! (2011). It was released as the title track from the EP by Cube Entertainment and Universal Music on July 5, 2011. The lyrics were written by Shinsadong Tiger and Choi Kyusung, who also composed the music. In order to promote the song and EP, Hyuna appeared on several South Korean music programs, including Music Bank, Show! Music Core and Inkigayo. A music video for the song was released on July 4 and has surpassed 100 million views on YouTube, making her the first female Korean solo artist to reach this milestone.

The single was a commercial success peaking at number 4 on the Gaon Digital Chart in its weekly issue and at number 6 in its monthly issue. The song also charted at number 40 for the year-end chart. The song is also featured in the 2017 dance video game Just Dance 2018. In 2016, the song was parodied in the Family Guy episode "Candy, Quahog Marshmallow".

Background and release
On June 26, 2011, Cube Entertainment confirmed that Hyuna would make her comeback on July with a new mini-album. They revealed, “The title track is an upgraded version of HyunA’s usual style. We’ll be promoting a track with a heavy beat that emphasizes HyunA’s powerful performance style.”  The song was released digitally and on the EPs Bubble Pop! on July 5, 2011.

On July 11, 2011, Hyuna released the practice video for “Bubble Pop".

Commercial performance 
"Bubble Pop!" was a commercial success. The song entered at number 11 on the Gaon Digital Chart on the chart issue dated July 3–9, 2011 with 582,760 downloads sold and 1,131,218 streams. In its second week, the song peaked at number 4 on the chart with 464,258 downloads sold and 1,618,604 streams. The song stayed in the Top 10 of the chart for two consecutive weeks and a total of eleven consecutive weeks in the Top 100 on the chart. The song peaked at number 6 on the Gaon Digital Chart for the month of July 2011. In the month of August the song placed at number 26, while in the month of September placed at number 78 . "Bubble Pop!" placed at number 40 on the Gaon Digital Chart 2011 year-end chart.

Music video and promotion

On June 30, 2011, the music video teaser for "Bubble Pop" was released. The video was filmed mid-June in Okinawa, Japan, and was officially released on July 4, 2011. The music video features a short cameo from Lee Joon from MBLAQ. The music video made Hyuna the first Korean female solo singer to reach more than 100 million views on a single YouTube video. Hyuna promoted the title track "Bubble Pop!" on music shows from July 8, 2011, on KBS's Music Bank, MBC's Show! Music Core, SBS's Inkigayo and Mnet's M! Countdown.

Accolades

Credits and personnel 
Hyuna — vocals, rap
Shinsadong Tiger — producing, songwriting, arranger, music
Choi Kyu-sung — producing, songwriting, arranger, music

Charts

Weekly charts

Monthly charts

Year-end charts

References

External links
 
 

Hyuna songs
2011 singles
Korean-language songs
2011 songs
Cube Entertainment singles
Songs written by Shinsadong Tiger